"Dreamer" is a ballad and the third track from Ozzy Osbourne's album Down to Earth, which was released on October 16, 2001. The single peaked at number 10 on Billboard's Mainstream Rock Tracks.  The song describes the rockstar's vision of  people and humanity destroying Earth. In the liner notes to Osbourne's Prince of Darkness box set, Ozzy refers to this song as his version of John Lennon's "Imagine". The Japanese and European press of the single also include a slightly different version of the song, dubbed "Dreamer (acoustic)", and a previously unreleased song titled "Black Skies".

Music video
The video shows Osbourne in two different locations: in a snowy forest, with shades of blue, where children play some instruments that can be heard in the music, such as violin and piano; and in a candlelit building, with shades of red, in which his band are. The clip was directed by Rob Zombie.

Personnel
Ozzy Osbourne - lead vocals
Zakk Wylde - guitar
Robert Trujillo - bass
Mike Bordin - drums
Tim Palmer - keyboards

Chart

Weekly charts

Year-end charts

Certifications

References

External links
Video

Ozzy Osbourne songs
2001 singles
Songs written by Ozzy Osbourne
Songs written by Marti Frederiksen
Songs written by Mick Jones (Foreigner)
2001 songs
Songs about dreams
Rock ballads